Andreas Maurer may refer to:
 Andreas Maurer (tennis)
 Andreas Maurer (Austrian politician)
 Andreas Maurer (German politician)